Lwazi Skosana (born 2 August 1991) is a South African footballer that currently plays as a midfielder for Orlando Pirates in the Premier Soccer League.

As a Moroka Swallows youth player, Skosana was promoted to the first in the 2010–11 season and has been a regular feature the first squad, being used mostly as a substitute. He never made any appearances in the 2012–13 season and Swallows declined to extend his contract.

In December 2013, Skosana has started to train with Orlando Pirates and on 16 January 2014, the club officially announced that he is a new Orlando Pirates player.

References

1991 births
Living people
People from Daveyton
South African soccer players
Association football midfielders
Moroka Swallows F.C. players
Orlando Pirates F.C. players
Roses United F.C. players
Sportspeople from Gauteng